Grijó de Parada is a civil parish in the municipality of Bragança, Portugal. The population in 2011 was 296, in an area of 31.19 km².

References

Parishes of Bragança, Portugal